Abdulaziz Belraysh (born July 12, 1990) is a Libyan footballer. He currently plays for Libyan Premier League club Ittihad, as a defender.

Career
Belraysh was a promising young talent, and a product of the Ittihad youth system. His displays during the 2008–09 season earned him the Young Player of the Year award.

He was called up to the national team for their friendly with Benin on January 6, 2010. He was also called up for their friendly with Mali, on March 3, 2010, starting in both matches, thus becoming a starting player with Libya by the age of 19.

References

Libyan footballers
1992 births
Living people
Libya international footballers
Al-Ittihad Club (Tripoli) players
2012 Africa Cup of Nations players
Association football defenders
Libyan Premier League players